Typo is an unincorporated community within Perry County, Kentucky, United States. Its post office has been closed.

Typo gained its name from loggers who tied poles to their logs to make rafts at the community.  Since the community is located at the mouth of Big Creek into the Kentucky River, loggers made their rafts there before continuing downriver. It has frequently been noted on lists of unusual place names.

References

Unincorporated communities in Perry County, Kentucky
Unincorporated communities in Kentucky
Coal towns in Kentucky